Alexei Scala (Aleksei Vasylyovych Skala; born 12 April 1965 in Bilhorod-Dnistrovskyi) is a former Moldovan football player of Ukrainian descent.

In 1992 Alexei Scala played 7 matches for Moldova national football team, scoring one goal.
He is the twin brother of Iurie Scala.

International goals
Scores and results list Moldova's goal tally first.

References

External links
 
 
 
 Alexei Scala International matches at 11v11.com

1965 births
People from Bilhorod-Dnistrovskyi
Living people
Soviet footballers
CS Tiligul-Tiras Tiraspol players
FC Zimbru Chișinău players
FK Neftchi Farg'ona players
FC Fakel Voronezh players
Kapaz PFK players
Moldovan footballers
Ukrainian Premier League players
Moldovan expatriate footballers
Expatriate footballers in Romania
FCM Bacău players
Expatriate footballers in Russia
Russian Premier League players
FC Tiraspol players
FC Tighina players

Association football forwards
Moldova international footballers